The Soling Competition at the 1996 Summer Olympics was held from 22 July to 2 August 1996, in Savannah, Georgia, United States. 
The competition was in a combined format. First the competitors had to sail a series of ten fleet races. Points were awarded for placement in each race. The best eight out of ten race scores did count for the placement in the match race series. After the fleetraces a series of matchraces were held to determine the winners.

Results after Fleetrace

The selected teams proceeded to the match race part of the event.

Results after Matchracing

 (5th) vs.  (6th) decided on basis of fleetrace result.

Daily standings

Conditions at Soling course area

Notes

References 
 
 
 
 
 
 

Soling
Olympic Soling Regattas